Nebria elliptipennis is a species of ground beetle from Nebriinae subfamily that is endemic to Turkey.

References

elliptipennis
Beetles described in 1874
Beetles of Asia
Endemic fauna of Turkey